Brain, Behavior, and Immunity is a peer-reviewed scientific journal published by Elsevier. It was established in 1987 by Robert Ader, and covers research on the relationship between the nervous system, psychology, and the immune system. It is the official journal of the Psychoneuroimmunology Research Society. According to the Journal Citation Reports, the journal has a 2021 impact factor of 19.227.

References

External links 
 

Elsevier academic journals
Immunology journals
Neuroscience journals
Publications established in 1987
English-language journals